The Modi'in Miracle was an Israeli baseball team from Modi'in in the Israel Baseball League.

The Miracle finished the inaugural 2007 season 22-19 (.537) in third place, and after upsetting the # 2 Tel Aviv Lightning in the semi-finals, lost to Ron Blomberg's Bet Shemesh Blue Sox 3-0 in the championship game.

Miracle catcher, and former Boston Red Sox minor leaguer, Eladio Rodriguez was the league batting champion (.461). and had 16 home runs in 102 at bats.  He was co-winner of The Hank Greenberg Award for Most Valuable Player.

6' 6" Maximo Nelson from San Pedro de Macorís, in the Dominican Republic, led the league with 85 strikeouts; he pitched for the Gulf Coast Yankees in 2004 (posting a 6-5 record, with a 2.63 ERA).

History

The name for the Miracle is a reference to the miracle of the Maccabean revolt (which started in the area presently known as Maccabim, just outside Modi'in) and victory over Antiochus IV Epiphanes in 167 BCE.  Thus the use of a hanukiah in the team's logo, an object commonly associated with the miracle victory of the Maccabees over the Greeks.

On February 26, 2007, it was announced that Major League Baseball player Art Shamsky of the "Miracle Mets" would be the manager of the Miracle.  Team colors also reflect Shamsky's stint with the New York Mets, and hopes that IBL officials had of creating a rivalry between the Bet Shemesh Blue Sox (similar colors to the New York Yankees) and the Miracle.

In the inaugural draft in 2007, the Modi'in Miracle selected with the first pick Aaron Levin, an infielder from Cuesta College.

Pitcher Sandy Koufax, then 71, was the last player chosen by the Miracle.  "His selection is a tribute to the esteem with which he is held by everyone associated with this league," said Art Shamsky, who manages the Miracle.  "It's been 41 years between starts for him. If he's rested and ready to take the mound again, we want him on our team."    Koufax declined the offer to join the team.

Stadium
Located in Kibbutz Gezer, Gezer Field was home to the Miracle as well as the Bet Shemesh Blue Sox.

Roster

Footnotes

External links
Official site of the Modi'in Miracle

Baseball teams in Israel
Modi'in-Maccabim-Re'ut